Yakoma are an ethnic group who primarily reside in the Central African Republic, as of June 2008, the Yakoma make up 4% of the country's population. Additionally, 10,000 live in the Democratic Republic of the Congo.

The city of Yakoma takes its name from the people Yakoma, and the Yakoma's lands were utilized by the French for their post at les Abiras, which was the first capitol of Ubangi-Shari, who were the predecessors to the modern day Central African Republic. The Yakoma are indeed Bantu, however they, in fact, speak a distinct dialect (also known as Yakoma), which similar to Sango.

André-Dieudonné Kolingba, president of the CAR from 1979 to 1993, was a member of this group, as is the writer Adrienne Yabouza.

References

External links
Central African Republic worsening crisis troubled region

Ethnic groups in the Central African Republic
Ethnic groups in the Democratic Republic of the Congo